The 2010 Liga de Ascenso Bicentenario is the second football tournament of the 2009–10 Liga de Ascenso season.

Club information

Stadia and locations

Classification Phase

General table

Position by fixture

Results

Final phase

 If the two teams are tied after both legs, the higher seeded team advances.
 The winner will qualify to the playoff match vs the Clausura 2010 winner

Awards

Top-ten goalscorers

Relegation table
Relegation is determined by a quotient of the total points earned in the Liga de Ascenso divided by the total number of games played over the past three seasons of the Liga de Ascenso (for clubs that have not been in the Liga de Ascenso all three seasons, the last consecutive seasons of participation are taken into account). The club with the lowest quotient is relegated to the Segunda División Profesional for the next season.

References

External links 
Official Website
Unofficial Website

2010 domestic association football leagues
Bi
Ascenso MX seasons